Ambient Dub Volume I is the first album by American composer Bill Laswell to be issued under the moniker Divination. It was released on October 8, 1993, by Subharmonic.

Track listing

Personnel 
Adapted from the Ambient Dub Volume I liner notes.

Musicians
Jeff Bova – bass guitar, keyboards, effects
Buckethead – effects
Bill Laswell – bass guitar, effects, producer
Robert Musso – effects, engineering, producer (4)
Nicky Skopelitis – guitar, effects
Liu Sola – voice, effects

Technical
Imad Mansour – assistant engineer
Thi-Linh Le – photography
Howie Weinberg – mastering

Release history

References

External links 
 
 Ambient Dub Volume I at Bandcamp

1993 albums
Albums produced by Bill Laswell
Bill Laswell albums
Subharmonic (record label) albums